Yagiite is a cyclosilicate mineral belonging to the osumilite group. It was discovered in 1968 in the iron meteorite that fell in Colomera in the province of Granada (Spain). Named after the Japanese mineralogist Kenzo Yagi, its CAS Registry Number is IMA1968-020.

Crystal structure and properties 
It is an anhydrous aluminosilicate of sodium and magnesium, which crystallizes in the hexagonal crystalline system with silicate tetrahedra arranged in double rings. In addition to the elements of its formula, it usually carries impurities: such as titanium, chromium, iron, manganese and calcium.

Locations 
Found only as an inclusion of silicate inside the iron meteorite of Colomera (Spain), in which yagiite has crystallized in an environment rich in magnesium and associated with other minerals such as diopside, whitlockite, tridymite, plagioclase of the type albite-anorthite, as well as iron-nickel alloys.

References

External links 

Yagiite, in mindat.org.
Yagiite, in webmineral.com.
Yagiite, Handbook of Mineralogy, Mineral Data Publishing.

Meteorite minerals
Hexagonal minerals
Minerals in space group 192
Aluminium minerals
Magnesium minerals
Sodium minerals
Cyclosilicates